Mentissella is a monotypic genus of gastropods belonging to the family Clausiliidae. The only species is Mentissella rebeli.

The species inhabits terrestrial environments.

References

Clausiliidae